"Famous Macedonia" is a Greek military march folk song often regarded as the regional anthem of Greek Macedonia, and used by the Hellenic Army since the Balkan Wars.

It is associated with the Macedonomachœ in the Macedonicos Agonas and can be heard on parades and in national anniversaries.

Until the recent introduction of 24-hour programming, it also marked the end of radio programs on the local Macedonian channel (Rádio Macedonía 102 FM"), played before the Greek national anthem.

It is written in Dorian scale, in iambic 15-syllable. The beat is 2/4 and it can be danced as a chasapico. It can be performed in conjunction with the Macedonia dance. In addition, the lyrics refers to Alexander the Great, who is the progenitor of the Greek Macedonians.

Origin
The origin of the march is not certain. According to an ethnographic study conducted in villages in Serres and Drama, the song wasn't known or danced to in the area. Women from Ano Oreini and Petrousa attribute the Greek lyrics and the teaching of the dance to an anonymous teacher after World War II. Women from Petrousa claim that the melody of the song is a modification of a local malady of theirs, which was made "somewhere more centrally", and they dance to a similar melody with Slavic lyrics and different steps, similar to those of other local traditional dances.

The musicologist Markos Dragoumis found a cassette with Ladino songs of Thessaloniki, which included the melody of the song, as a composition made for the opening of the Schola de la Alianza, the first Jewish school of Thessaloniki, in 1873. Dragoumis guesses that it was either composed for the opening of the school and later was transmitted to the groups in the area, or it was originally composed in the middle of the 19th century by some Western composer for the Ottoman Sultan and later used by the Jewish communities.

According to the Greek Army's website, it is a military march or emvatirio based on the traditional Macedonicos choros, which is related with Acrítes of Byzantium.

Lyrics

Current version

Original version

Notes

References

External links
 An arrangement for mixed choir by Nicolas Astrinidis – YouTube (vocal score and parts)
 Another remixed version – YouTube

Regional songs
Greek patriotic songs
Macedonia (Greece)
Hellenic Army